was a  of the Imperial Japanese Navy.

Design and description
The Yūgumo class was a repeat of the preceding  with minor improvements that increased their anti-aircraft capabilities. Their crew numbered 228 officers and enlisted men. The ships had two Kampon geared steam turbines, each driving one propeller shaft, using steam provided by three Kampon water-tube boilers.

The main armament of the Yūgumo class consisted of six Type 3  guns in three twin-gun turrets, one superfiring pair aft and one turret forward of the superstructure. The guns were able to elevate up to 75° to increase their ability against aircraft, but their slow rate of fire, slow traversing speed, and the lack of any sort of high-angle fire-control system meant that they were virtually useless as anti-aircraft guns. They were built with four Type 96  anti-aircraft guns in two twin-gun mounts, but more of these guns were added over the course of the war. The ships were also armed with eight  torpedo tubes in a two quadruple traversing mounts; one reload was carried for each tube. Their anti-submarine weapons comprised two depth charge throwers for which 36 depth charges were carried.

Construction and career
During the 30 November 1942 Battle of Tassafaronga, Naganami led a supply-drum transport run to Guadalcanal (cover), and engaged a U.S. cruiser-destroyer group.

On 23 October 1944, during the Battle of Leyte Gulf, Naganami escorted Admiral Kurita's 1st Diversion Attack Force. During this time period she assisted in the rescue of the survivors of the cruiser , later transferring them to the battleship . She escorted the damaged cruiser  back to Brunei.

On 10 November 1944 Naganami joined the escort of troop convoy TA No. 3 as it approached Ormoc, of what was then known as the Battle of Ormoc Bay. She was sunk by aircraft of Task Force 38 on 11 November in Ormoc Bay, west of Leyte. An explosion amidships broke the ship in two.

Rediscovery
Naganami's wreck was found in November 2017 by Microsoft co-founder Paul Allen's research ship, RV Petrel 827 ft (252 m) below the surface of Ormoc Bay.

Notes

References

External links
 CombinedFleet.com: Yūgumo-class destroyers
 CombinedFleet.com: Naganami history

Yūgumo-class destroyers
World War II destroyers of Japan
Destroyers sunk by aircraft
Shipwrecks in the Philippine Sea
1942 ships
Maritime incidents in November 1944
Ships sunk by US aircraft
Shipwreck discoveries by Paul Allen
2017 archaeological discoveries
Ships built by Fujinagata Shipyards